Terryglass is a village in County Tipperary, Ireland. The small town is located on the R493 regional road on the north-eastern shore of Lough Derg near where the River Shannon enters the Lough. It is a civil parish in the historical barony of Ormond Lower.  It is also an Ecclesiastical parish in the Roman Catholic Diocese of Killaloe,. Terryglass won the Irish Tidy Towns Competition in 1983 and 1997.

History
In the early Middle Ages, the place was known as Tír dá glass (also Tirdaglas and Tirraglasse). A monastery (abbey) was founded there by Columba of Terryglass (d. 13 December 552) in 549. He was the son of Colum mac Crimthainn and a disciple of St. Finnian of Clonard. He was one of the Twelve Apostles of Ireland. The monastery became a centre of learning and produced (about 1160) the Book of Leinster, which is now housed in Trinity College Dublin. The Book is an important collection of history, tales and poems written in Middle Irish and is believed to be the work of Áed Ua Crimthainn, a 12th-century abbot of Terryglass.

The Vikings frequently raided the abbey. In 843 an expedition led by Turgesius raided Terryglass and neighbouring Lorrha and in 1164 the abbey was burnt. A remaining wall from this abbey can be seen at the back of 
Old Church in the village.

Wells
Terryglass has two holy wells: St. Augh's Eye Well and St. Columba's Headache Well. St. Augh's Eye Well is located on the quay and is dedicated to the 9th century Christian saint named Augh. Local legend holds that Augh lost his eyes to a Danish chieftain who lived in Slevoir. Augh is reputed to have regained his sight thanks to water from the eye well. Believers visit the well on Saturdays during the month of May between sunrise and sunset in search of cures for eye problems. The ritual begins on the flagstone facing the rising sun and continues with attendees reciting a creed, 5 Our Fathers and 5 Hail Marys on each side of the well. When the prayers are completed their eyes are washed with water from the well. Small offerings such as flowers are left on a nearby bush. The well's source is a nearby stream. Legend claims that Saint Patrick baptised people in the well when he visited the area. St. Columba's Headache Well is located in the village of Terryglass. It is named after Columba and is alleged to cure headaches and migraines.

Sport and recreation
Shannon Rovers GAA, which incorporates Terryglass, Kilbarron and surrounding areas, is based in Páirc an Phobail, Ballinderry. The club's jersey colours are red and white.

Shannon Rangers FC is a local association football (soccer) club. Also based in Páirc an Phobail, its kit colours are black with red trim for the junior team, and red and black vertical stripes for underage levels.

Terryglass is on one of several north Tipperary Cycle Routes. This 65 km route starts at Banba Square, Nenagh and is listed as a half day cycle.

Terryglass is a common location for boating, having both public and private marinas.

Notable Residents, past and present
Columba of Terryglass (died 13 December 552) was one of the Twelve Apostles of Ireland. He founded the monastery of Terryglass in 548 and was buried within its precincts.
Sir William Hickie, an Irish born Major General of the British Army and an Irish nationalist politician, lived in Slevoir.
Rickard Deasy (Farming Campaigner)
Martin O'Meara VC (born 1882), recipient of the Victoria Cross.

Annalistic references
See Annals of Inisfallen (AI)

 AI717.1 Kl.Repose of Manchán of Liath, and of Congertach, abbot of Tír dá Glas.
 AI740.1 Kl. Maenchíne, abbot of Tuaim Gréine, and Cillíne, abbot of Tír dá Glas, [rested].
 AI777.4 The drowning of more than a hundred of the Connachta at Tír dá Glas.
 AI784.3 Repose of Cumascach, abbot of Tír dá Glas.
 AI844.1 Kl. The plundering of Dún Másc, in which Aed son of Dub dá Chrích, abbot of Tír dá Glas, fell.
 AI895.2 Repose of Mael Petair son of Cúán, abbot of Tír dá Glas and Cluain Ferta Brénainn.
 AI965.1 Kl. Repose of Dunchad, abbot of Tír dá Glas.
 AI1008.2 Repose of Céilechair son of Donn Cuan, abbot of Tír dá Glas.

See also
 List of civil parishes of Tipperary
 Cormac mac Ceithearnach
 List of towns and villages in the Republic of Ireland

References

External links
 Placenames Database of Ireland
 terryglass.com
 Griffiths Valuation of Ireland - Terryglass, County Tipperary
 The Tidy Towns of Ireland "Celebrating 50 years"

Parishes of the Roman Catholic Diocese of Killaloe
Populated places on the River Shannon
Towns and villages in County Tipperary
Tourist attractions in County Tipperary
Civil parishes of Ormond Lower